The Battle of Carnifex Ferry took place on September 10, 1861 in Nicholas County, Virginia (now West Virginia), as part of the Operations in Western Virginia Campaign during the American Civil War. The battle resulted in a Union strategic victory that contributed to the eventual Confederate withdrawal from western Virginia, which in turn led to the creation of the State of West Virginia two years later.

The battle took its name from a former settlement, which was named after the local Carnefix family.

Opposing forces

Union

Confederate

The battle
In late August 1861, Confederate forces under Brig. Gen. John B. Floyd crossed the Gauley River and surprised the 7th Ohio Infantry under Col. Erastus Tyler at Kessler's Cross Lanes. Outnumbered, Tyler's inexperienced men routed, and Floyd camped near Carnifex Ferry. The Confederates began throwing up entrenchments on the Henry Patteson farm (located on the rim of the Gauley River Canyon near Summersville).

Concerned about Floyd's drive to reclaim the Kanawha Valley, Union Brigadier General William S. Rosecrans led three brigades of infantry southward from Clarksburg to support Tyler's regrouped regiment. Moving into position on the afternoon of September 10, Rosecrans advanced against Floyd's campsite and attacked. The Confederate lines repulsed the attacks and the Federal casualties were significantly higher than the defenders. The strength of Rosecrans's artillery proved to be problematic however, and Floyd decided to retreat that night across the ferry to the south side of the Gauley River. He subsequently moved eastward to Meadow Bluff near Lewisburg.

Floyd, seeking to deflect the blame, placed the responsibility for the defeat on his co-commander Brigadier General Henry A. Wise, furthering the dissension that marked the Confederate high command in western Virginia.

Battlefield preservation
In October 1935, the battlefield was preserved as Carnifex Ferry Battlefield State Park.

Gallery

See also

Thomas J. Kelly (Irish nationalist)

References

External links

Carnifex Ferry Battlefield State Park's website
The West Virginia Review, 1931: Detailed overview of the battle

Battle of Carnifex Ferry
Western Virginia campaign
Battles of the Eastern Theater of the American Civil War
Nicholas County, West Virginia
Battles of the American Civil War in West Virginia
Union victories of the American Civil War
1861 in the American Civil War
September 1861 events